Buck Creek Township is one of nine townships in Hancock County, Indiana, United States. As of the 2010 census, its population was 8,430 and it contained 3,158 housing units.

History
Buck Creek Township was established in 1831. It was named from Buck Creek, its largest waterway.

Lockheed PV-2 Harpoon No. 37396 was listed on the National Register of Historic Places in 2009.

Geography
The streams of Amity Branch, Lead Creek and Snider Branch run through this township.

Cities and towns
 Cumberland (northeast half)

Unincorporated towns
 Mohawk
 Mount Comfort
 Pleasant Acres
(This list is based on USGS data and may include former settlements.)

Adjacent townships
 Vernon Township (north)
 Center Township (east)
 Sugar Creek Township (south)
 Warren Township, Marion County (southwest)
 Lawrence Township, Marion County (northwest)

Cemeteries
The township contains nine cemeteries: Arnett, Burris, Fish, Griffith, Mount Pleasant, Pet, Scotten, Snider and Steele.

Major highways
  Interstate 70

Airports and landing strips
 Indianapolis Regional Airport

References
 
 United States Census Bureau cartographic boundary files

External links
 Indiana Township Association
 United Township Association of Indiana

Townships in Hancock County, Indiana
Townships in Indiana